Vice Admiral Thomas Wells (1759 – 31 October 1811) was a Royal Navy officer who became Commander-in-Chief, The Nore.

Naval career
Wells joined the Royal Navy in 1774. He became commanding officer of the frigate HMS Melampus in early 1794 during the French Revolutionary Wars. Melampus had five men killed and five wounded. He went on to be commanding officer of the third-rate HMS Defence later in 1794 and commanding officer of the second-rate HMS Glory in 1799. He acted as a pallbearer at the funeral of Lord Nelson in October 1805. After that he became Commander-in-Chief, The Nore in 1807 and was promoted to Vice Admiral of the Red in 1808.

See also
Admiral Wells – pub in Holme

References

Sources

1759 births
1811 deaths
Royal Navy vice admirals